Melton railway station is located on the Serviceton line in Victoria, Australia. It serves the western Melbourne suburb of Melton South, and opened on 2 April 1884.

History
Melton station opened on 2 April 1884, when the railway line from Braybrook Junction was extended. Like the suburb itself, the station was named after Melton Mowbray in Leicestershire, England.

In 1886, the line was extended westward to Parwan and, being on a single track section, the station was the site of a crossing loop from that time. By 1889, the station had an interlocked signal box, single passenger platform, and a three road yard. There was a goods shed opposite the passenger platform.

In 1962, flashing light signals were provided at the Exford Road level crossing, located nearby in the up direction of the station. with boom barriers provided in 1990.

In 1987, the yard was rationalised to be purely a main line and crossing loop, but it was not until 1991 that the second platform was added. In 1998, the station building was refurbished.

As part of the Regional Fast Rail project, control of the signals was transferred to the Ballarat signal box in 2005. The station still retains the lever frame for historical purposes.

First announced by the Andrews State Government in 2018, the station is set to be integrated into the metropolitan railway network, as part of the Western Rail Plan.

As part of the Regional Rail Revival project, 18km of track was duplicated between Deer Park West and Melton. It was provided in late 2019, coinciding with the opening of Cobblebank.

Announced in October 2022, Melton will be lowered to remove four level crossings on the line. Further details, designs and a construction timeline will be released closer to 2028.

Platforms and services
Melton has two side platforms. It is served by V/Line Ballarat and Ararat line trains.

Platform 1:
  services to Southern Cross
  services to Southern Cross

Platform 2:
  services to Bacchus Marsh and Wendouree
  services to Ararat

Transport links
Transit Systems Victoria operates six routes to and from Melton station, under contract to Public Transport Victoria:
 : to Melton
 : to Cobblebank station
 : to Micasa Rise/Roslyn Park (Harkness)
 : to Melton
 : to Kurunjang
 : to Arnolds Creek (Melton West)

References

External links
 Victorian Railway Stations gallery
 Melway map at street-directory.com.au

Railway stations in Melbourne
Railway stations in Australia opened in 1884
Railway stations in the City of Melton